Trevor le Mare Sharpe LVO OBE LRAM ARCM (1921 – 22 May 2010) was a British army officer (Lieutenant Colonel), composer, music educator and conductor.

Sharpe was appointed the Director of Music of the Coldstream Guards in 1963, as such he was credited at the end of each episode of Dad's Army as the regiment performed the closing theme tune.

Discography

Ceremonial Occasion 
Sharpe released Ceremonial Occasion with the Band of the Royal Military School of Music (Kneller Hall), and the Fanfare Trumpeters of the Royal Military School of Music, it was produced by Treasure Island Music.

References 

1921 births
2010 deaths
Military personnel from Kent
20th-century British conductors (music)
20th-century British composers
Dad's Army
Coldstream Guards officers
British Army officers
British military musicians
Associates of the Royal College of Music